Conjurer's Field Archeological Site is a historic archaeological site located at Colonial Heights, Virginia. The prehistoric village site (44CF20) is one of the last of the larger Middle and Late Woodland period villages located along the Appomattox River.  The site include several well preserved burials, ceramic wares, and the presence of an undisturbed prehistoric midden.

It was listed on the National Register of Historic Places in 1990. In 2003, it was incorporated into the Conjurer's Neck Archeological District.

References

Archaeological sites on the National Register of Historic Places in Virginia
National Register of Historic Places in Colonial Heights, Virginia
Historic district contributing properties in Virginia